The Meritorious Service Medal was a military decoration of South Vietnam that was awarded between the years of 1950 and 1974.  Each of the three branches of the Republic of Vietnam Military Forces had its own version of the Meritorious Service Medal. The medal was intended to recognize exceptionally important military achievement, both in combat and non-combat service, but did not warrant receipt of the higher decoration the Distinguished Service Order.

Criteria
The Meritorious Service Medal was awarded, or posthumously awarded, to non-commissioned officers and enlisted personnel in the Republic of Vietnam Military Forces who, during their period of service met one of the following requirements:
Cited or wounded many times in combat or in line of duty.
Accomplishing an exceptionally important achievement that reflects great credit on or is beneficial to the Republic of Vietnam Armed Forces in any field.

The Meritorious Service Medal could also be awarded to foreign non-commissioned officers and enlisted personnel for their meritorious service to the Republic of Vietnam.

See also 
Orders, decorations, and medals of South Vietnam

References

External links
Military Orders, Decorations, and Medals of the Republic of Vietnam
Military awards and decorations of Vietnam